Joe D. Montgomery (January 28, 1918 – October 5, 2013) was an American politician, educator, and businessman.

Born in Floydada, Texas, he served in the United States Army Air Forces during World War II. He graduated from Colorado State University. Montgomery went to San Francisco, California and then moved to Anchorage, Alaska where he was an educator, principal, and superintendent of the Anchorage Public Schools. He also owned an automobile agency. He served two terms as a Republican in the Alaska House of Representatives from 1979 to 1983. He died in Anchorage, Alaska.

References

External links
 Joe Montgomery at 100 Years of Alaska's Legislature

1918 births
2013 deaths
Anchorage School District
Colorado State University alumni
Educators from Texas
Republican Party members of the Alaska House of Representatives
People from Floydada, Texas
Politicians from Anchorage, Alaska
School superintendents in Alaska
Schoolteachers from Alaska
United States Army Air Forces personnel of World War II
United States Army Air Forces soldiers